Tajabad (also Romanized as Tājābād) is a village in Karkas Rural District, in the Central District of Natanz County, Isfahan Province, Iran. At the 2006 census, its population was 20, in 5 families.

References 

Populated places in Natanz County